Tritonia bollandi is a species of dendronotid nudibranch. It is a marine gastropod mollusc in the family Tritoniidae.

Distribution 
The type locality of this species is Seragaki Tombs, Okinawa. It is also reported from Indonesia and from Singapore.

References

Tritoniidae
Gastropods described in 2003